James Michael Harvey (born October 20, 1949) is an American prelate of the Catholic Church. Trained as a diplomat, he served from 1982 to 1998 in the central administration of the Holy See's Secretariat of State. From 1998 to 2012 Harvey managed the pope's household, first for Pope John Paul II and then for Pope Benedict XVI. He was named a bishop in 1998, an archbishop in 2003, and a cardinal in 2012.

Since March 4, 2022, Harvey has been the highest ranking member of the order of cardinal deacons young enough to vote in a papal conclave, which gives him the responsibility of announcing the election of a new pope.

Biography

Early years and priesthood 
Harvey was born in Milwaukee, Wisconsin, on October 20, 1949. He was ordained to the priesthood for the Archdiocese of Milwaukee on June 29, 1975, by Pope Paul VI in Rome. Harvey studied at St. Francis Seminary and then resided at the Pontifical North American College while studying for a Doctor of Canon Law degree at the Pontifical Gregorian University. He also studied diplomacy at the Pontifical Ecclesiastical Academy in Rome.

Harvey entered the Vatican diplomatic service on March 25, 1980. He served as attaché and then secretary in the apostolic nunciature in the Dominican Republic for two years. On July 10, 1982, Harvey took a position in the Section for Relations with States of the Secretariat of State. He was named assessor for general affairs of that secretariat on July 22, 1997.

Prefect of the papal households and archbishop 
On February 7, 1998, Harvey was named prefect of the papal household by Pope John Paul II, who consecrated him a bishop of the titular see of Memphis on March 19, 1998. As prefect, he oversaw the restoration of the papal audience hall and the papal apartments at Castel Gandolfo in Lazio, Italy. The pope elevated him to archbishop on September 29, 2003. Later in 2012, a member of Harvey's staff was convicted of stealing documents and leaking them to the media.

Archpriest and cardinal 
Pope Benedict XVI appointed Harvey as archpriest of St Paul Outside the Walls, one of the four major basilicas in Rome, on November 23, 2012. The next day, the pope appointed him cardinal-deacon of San Pio V a Villa Carpegna. On December 22, 2012, Harvey was appointed a member of the Congregation for the Causes of Saints for a five-year renewable term. On January 31, 2013, Harvey was appointed a member of the Administration of the Patrimony of the Apostolic See and the Congregation for the Evangelization of Peoples. Harvey was one of the cardinal electors who participated in the 2013 papal conclave that elected Pope Francis.

Harvey was awarded the title Knight Grand Cross of the Order of Merit of the Italian Republic by the President of the Republic in 1999. He has also been titled Knight Grand Cross of the Order of Isabella the Catholic.

Pope Francis named Harvey a member of the Supreme Tribunal of the Apostolic Signatura on June 21, 2021.

Since March 4, 2022, Harvey has been–among the cardinal electors–the highest ranking member of the order of cardinal deacons and therefore has the responsibility of the protodeacon for announcing the election of a new pope.

Besides his native English, he speaks Italian, German, French, and Spanish.

McCarrick scandal
According to a 2018 Washington Post report, Harvey was one of many Catholic prelates who received large cash gifts from former cardinal Theodore McCarrick. In an interview, Harvey said that receiving money from other prelates was in no way out of the ordinary, adding that "it never occurred to me that this would be in some way improper" and that "it wasn't about currying favor".

References

External links

 

Prefects of the Papal Household
Pontifical Ecclesiastical Academy alumni
Pontifical North American College alumni
Commanders Crosses of the Order of Merit of the Federal Republic of Germany
Knights Grand Cross of the Order of Isabella the Catholic
21st-century American Roman Catholic titular archbishops
Roman Catholic Archdiocese of Milwaukee
Religious leaders from Milwaukee
St. Francis Seminary (Wisconsin) alumni
1949 births
Living people
Knights Grand Cross of the Order of Merit of the Italian Republic
21st-century American cardinals
Cardinals created by Pope Benedict XVI
Members of the Congregation for the Causes of Saints
Members of the Congregation for the Evangelization of Peoples